Sólo Tú may refer to:
"Solo Tu", 1965 song by Rita Pavone
"Sólo Tú" (Sergio Vallín song), 2009
"Sólo Tú", 1976 song by Camilo Sesto
Sólo Tú", 1997 song by Grupo Exterminador
"Sólo Tú", 1999 song by Jací Velasquez from the album Llegar A Ti
"Sólo Tú", 2014 song by Zion & Lennox
"Sólo Tú", 2019 song by Akon from the album El Negreeto

See also 
"Tú Sólo Tú, song by Selena